Nikita Anatolyevich Shershov (born 26 June 2004) is a Russian footballer who plays as a left winger or left midfielder for FC Orenburg.

Career
Shershov made his debut for FC Orenburg on 31 August 2022 in a Russian Cup game against Akhmat Grozny.

Career statistics

References

External links
 
 
 

Living people
2004 births
Russian footballers
Footballers from Saint Petersburg
Association football midfielders
Russian Second League players
FC Orenburg players